was a Japanese freestyle swimmer. She competed in two events at the 1936 Summer Olympics.

References

External links
 

1921 births
Possibly living people
Japanese female freestyle swimmers
Olympic swimmers of Japan
Swimmers at the 1936 Summer Olympics